Otto Karl Albrecht Ritschl (26 June 1860 in Bonn – 28 September 1944 in Bonn) was a German theologian, the son of Albrecht Ritschl.

After studying at Göttingen, Bonn and Giessen, he became professor at Kiel (extraordinarius) in 1889 and afterwards at Bonn (extraordinarius 1894; ordinarius 1897). He published, among other works, Schleiermachers Stellung zum Christentum in seinen Reden über die Religion (1888), and a Life of his father (2 vols, 1829–96).

Selected works
 Cyprian von Karthago und die Verfassung der Kirche. Eine kirchengeschichtliche und kirchenrechtliche Untersuchung Göttingen: Vandenhoeck & Ruprecht, 1885.
 Albrecht Ritschls Leben (2 voll., Freiburg i.B.: J.C.B. Mohr, 1892-1896).
 Dogmengeschichte des Protestantismus. Grundlagen und Grundzüge der theologischen Gedenken- und Lehrbildung in den protestantischen Kirchen Leipzig: J. C. Hinrichs, 1908–27.
 System und systematische Methode in der Geschichte des wissenschaftlichen Sprachgebrauchs und der philosophischen Methodologie Bonn: Carl Georgi, Universitats-Buchdruckerei und Verlag, 1906.

External links
 

1860 births
1944 deaths
German Lutheran theologians
19th-century German Protestant theologians
20th-century German Protestant theologians
Writers from Bonn
People from the Rhine Province
University of Göttingen alumni
University of Bonn alumni
Academic staff of the University of Bonn
University of Giessen alumni
Academic staff of the University of Kiel
19th-century German male writers
German male non-fiction writers